Dauwe may refer to:

 Johnny Dauwe (1966–2003) Belgian cyclist
 Laurent Dauwe (born 1966) Belgian soccer player

See also

 Douwe
 
 Dauw
 Douw (disambiguation)
 DAUH
 Dau (disambiguation)
 Daw (disambiguation)
 Doe (disambiguation)
 Doh (disambiguation)
 Dou (disambiguation)
 Dow (disambiguation)
 Duh (disambiguation)
 Dough (disambiguation)